The Palouse River is a tributary of the Snake River in Washington and Idaho, in the northwest United States. It flows for  southwestwards, primarily through the Palouse region of southeastern Washington. It is part of the Columbia River Basin, as the Snake River is a tributary of the Columbia River.

Its canyon was carved out by a fork in the catastrophic Missoula Floods of the previous ice age, which spilled over the northern Columbia Plateau and flowed into the Snake River, eroding the river's present course in a few thousand years.

Course

The Palouse River flows from northern Idaho into southeast Washington through the Palouse region, named for the river.

The river originates in Idaho in northeastern Latah County, in the Hoodoo Mountains in the St. Joe National Forest. It flows westward, near State Highway 6, as it nears the state line.  In Washington, the river flows in Whitman County to Palouse and then to Colfax, where it meets its South Fork, which originates on the south slopes of Moscow Mountain of the Palouse Range, flows south of Moscow and west to Pullman. (Paradise Creek parallels the South Fork, running through Moscow to Pullman, accompanied by the Bill Chipman Palouse Trail and State Route 270.)

From Colfax, the river meanders west and ends up in the lower Snake River southwest of Hooper, but not before dropping  over Palouse Falls.  The Palouse River enters the Snake River below the Little Goose Dam and above the Lower Monumental Dam.

Basin and discharge

Geology

The ancestral Palouse River flowed through the now-dry Washtucna Coulee directly into the Columbia River. The present-day canyon was created when the Missoula Floods overtopped the northern drainage divide of the ancestral Palouse River, diverting it to the current course to the Snake River by eroding a new, deeper channel.

The area is characterized by interconnected and hanging flood-created coulees, cataracts, plunge pools, kolk created potholes, rock benches, buttes and pinnacles typical of scablands.

See also

 Palouse Falls State Park
 List of rivers of Idaho
 List of longest streams of Idaho
 List of rivers of Washington
 Tributaries of the Columbia River

References

External links

 
 
 Palouse River Fishing
 Palouse Falls
 Soil Erosion in Palouse River Watershed

Rivers of Idaho
Rivers of Washington (state)
Tributaries of the Snake River
Rivers of Franklin County, Washington
Rivers of Whitman County, Washington
Rivers of Adams County, Washington
Rivers of Latah County, Idaho